Ramón Pagayon Santos (born 25 February 1941) is a Filipino composer, ethnomusicologist, and educator known for being the Philippines' foremost living exponent of contemporary Filipino classical music, for work that expounds on "the aesthetic frameworks of Philippine and Southeast Asian artistic traditions," and for finding new uses of indigenous Philippine instruments.

A University Professor Emeritus of the composition and theory department at the College of Music of the University of the Philippines Diliman, he was proclaimed National Artist of the Philippines for music in 2014.

Work as ethnomusicologist 
In 1976, Santos began doing fieldwork among folk religious groups in Quezon, collecting and documenting their music. He later also did similar fieldwork among the Ibaloi, Mansaka, Bontoc, Yakan and Boholano peoples.  The Philippines' National Commission on Culture and the Arts notes that as a result, Santos' compositions beginning in this period in his professional life were characterized by "the translation of indigenous musical systems into modern musical discourse."

Compositions 
Some of Santos' compositions include:
 Rituwal ng Pasasalamat,
 Likas-An,
 Badiw as Kapoonan,
 Awit ni Pulau,
 Daragang Magayon,
 Ta-O, 
 Sandiwaan,
 Nagnit Igak G’nan Wagnwag Nila (Alingawngaw ng Kagitingan), 
 Kulintang, and
 Panaghoy

Recognition 
Santos was made a Chevalier de l'Ordre des Arts et Lettres in 1987.

He was one of six people added to the roster of National Artists of the Philippines in 2014.

See also 
 José Maceda
 Lucrecia Kasilag

References

1941 births
Chevaliers of the Ordre des Arts et des Lettres
National Artists of the Philippines
University of the Philippines alumni
Indiana University alumni
University at Buffalo alumni
Living people
People from Pasig
Filipino classical composers
Musicians from Metro Manila